McLardy is a surname. Notable people with the surname include:

Alexander McLardy (1867–1913), Scottish footballer
Andrew McLardy (born 1974), South African golfer
Frank McLardy (1915–1981), English fascist and Nazi collaborator

See also
McHardy
McLardie
McLarty